"The King of Rock 'n' Roll" is a single by English pop band Prefab Sprout, released by Kitchenware Records in March 1988. It was the second single taken from their album of that year, From Langley Park to Memphis. It remains the band's biggest success in their native UK, reaching No. 7 on the UK Singles Chart, where it spent 11 weeks.

Composition
Paddy McAloon wrote "The King of Rock 'n' Roll" in February 1985 as a companion piece to another new song he wrote at that time, "Cars and Girls". The lyric was prompted by an NME article about an Edwyn Collins gig where Collins covered Kevin Johnson's "Rock and Roll (I Gave You the Best Years of My Life)". McAloon's dislike for songs with 'rock 'n' roll' in the title compelled him to write one of his own.

The song's lyrics concern a washed-up 1950s star who is only remembered for his one-hit novelty song, which is sung in the chorus ("Hot dog, jumping frog, Albuquerque"). McAloon has described "The King of Rock 'n' Roll" as a purpose-built catchy song, and Rolling Stones David Wild has described the song as a "bouncy, seemingly upbeat pop tune" that "actually tells the rather barbed tale of a middle-aged one-hit wonder condemned to sing the same juvenile ditty over and over".

The song's commercial and singalong qualities are unlike the work Prefab Sprout were known for in 1985, and McAloon initially felt the song was of no use to his band. He changed his mind and felt a lighter song may surprise fans used to his work being "very precise and delicate". That year, he joked in an interview while promoting the album Steve McQueen, "you won’t catch Prefab Sprout with titles like "Rebel Land" or "King of Rock ‘n’ Roll"!"

Recording
The song was recorded with Steve McQueen producer Thomas Dolby for From Langley Park to Memphis, one of four songs Dolby produced for the album. Dolby could not commit to producing the entire album due to his work on the soundtrack for the critical and commercial flop Howard the Duck. Dolby added a synth bass in the verses to mimic the sound of a bullfrog, tying them to the chorus.

Release
The song entered the UK Singles Chart on 23 March 1988 at No. 77, eventually reaching two weeks at No. 7 from 28 April to 10 May. Ultimately, the song spent 11 weeks in the top 100, and remains the band's only top ten single. Paddy McAloon made an appearance on Channel 4's Wired on 13 May 1988, performing a solo acoustic version of the song in front of Grey's Monument in the centre of Newcastle. The band promoted the single with mimed performances of the song on Top Of The Pops and Wogan. An unusual music video was produced for the song, featuring the band lying beside a pool and attended by a frog butler, a diver who is reluctant to jump into the pool until the end, and dancing human-size hot dogs.

Reception and legacy
Writing for Sound on Sound, Tom Doyle described the song as "naggingly catchy and knowingly daft". In a 2013 Red Bull Music Academy article, Angus Finlayson implored readers to "listen beyond the nonchalant synth pop bounce, you may detect a note of poignancy in this tale of an aging pop star still dining out on the success of his first hit." The song features in the "Gatherings" episode of Edgar Wright's sitcom Spaced, first broadcast on 1 October 1999, with Daisy (Jessica Stevenson) mis-singing the chorus as "Hot dog, jumping frog, almond cookies." The 2020 Netflix series I Am Not Okay with This features a scene where Stanley Barber (Wyatt Oleff) lip syncs and dances to the song. In 2014, the song was used in a British television advertising campaign by Boots.

Reflecting on the song in 2000, Prefab Sprout drummer Neil Conti declared "The King of Rock 'n' Roll" "the f***ing kiss of death for this band because it pushed everything in a poppy direction and the record company just wanted more of that. And that song was a joke! It's a song about a guy who dreams about being a rock 'n' roll star and ends up a one hit wonder – although Prefab were never a one hit wonder, it’s still ironic in a weird sort of way". McAloon has similarly acknowledged an irony in the single's success and related how Paul McCartney told him at one of his Buddy Holly-themed parties that the song was "your "My Ding-a-Ling"". The song was performed on Prefab Sprout's UK and European tours in 1990, but was notably left out of their 2000 UK tour setlists. McAloon has described himself as "reconciled to being remembered for that song" and "aware that it's a bit like being known for "Yellow Submarine" rather than "Hey Jude"."

Track listings
7" vinyl singleSide 1 "The King of Rock 'n' Roll"Side 2 "Moving the River"

12" vinyl singleSide 1 "The King of Rock 'n' Roll"
 "Moving the River"Side 2'
 "Dandy of the Danube"
 "Tin Can Pot"

CD single
 "The King of Rock 'n' Roll"
 "Moving the River"
 "Dandy of the Danube"
 "He'll Have to Go"

Charts

References
 Footnotes

 Citations

External links

Prefab Sprout songs
1988 singles
Songs written by Paddy McAloon
1988 songs